Michael A. Tibollo (born February 11, 1960) is a Canadian politician in Ontario, who is currently serving as Associate Minister of Mental Health and Addictions. He was elected to the Legislative Assembly of Ontario in the 2018 provincial election. representing the riding of Vaughan—Woodbridge as a member of the Progressive Conservative Party of Ontario. He served as Minister of Tourism, Culture, and Sport from 2018 to 2019.

Background and education 
Tibollo was born and raised in Toronto, Ontario. He is an alumnus of St. Michael's College School in Toronto, Ontario. He attended the University of Toronto where he received his undergraduate degree in 1982. He then obtained a law degree from the University of Windsor in 1985. Tibollo was called to the bar of the Law Society of Upper Canada in 1987. In 1995, Tibollo completed the program of instruction for lawyers: negotiation workshop at Harvard Law School.

Tibollo has received numerous awards for his career and community involvement, including:

 2017: CHIN Radio/TV International, CHIN Radio/TV International Salutes Canada 150 with ethno-cultural honourees who have enriched and helped build a strong and vibrant Canadian society
 2015: Order of the Republic of Italy, Knight
 2013: National Congress of Italian Canadians - Toronto District, Order of Merit Award
 2012: Queen's Jubilee, Government of Canada 125 Medal, Recipient
 2009: Government of the Province of Foggia, Italy, Humanitarian Award
 2005: Canadian Italian Business and Professional Association, Professional Excellence Award

Career 
Tibollo was formerly the principal at Tibollo and Associates Professional Corporation and has been a practising lawyer for the last 30 years. The law firm is located in Woodbridge, Ontario.

In May 2017, Tibollo announced his intention to seek the PC candidate nomination for the provincial riding of Vaughan—Woodbridge. He later won against former Ontario Liberal Minister Steven Del Duca.

Tibollo is the honorary chairman of the Caritas School of Life, a residential therapeutic community that provides services to men suffering from mental health and addictions problems.

Tibollo was instrumental in creating Italian Heritage Month and is the founder of the Festival of Light, an annual multicultural festival celebrating diversity of culture and religion in Canada.

Tibollo won re-election in 2022, running against Del Duca, who was voted Ontario Liberal Party leader in 2020.

Electoral record

Cabinet positions

References
 

1960 births
Progressive Conservative Party of Ontario MPPs
21st-century Canadian politicians
Living people
Canadian people of Italian descent
Lawyers in Ontario
Members of the Executive Council of Ontario
Politicians from Toronto
University of Windsor Faculty of Law alumni
University of Toronto alumni
Knights of the Order of Merit of the Italian Republic